Edward T. O'Connor Jr. (born October 6, 1942) is an American Democratic Party politician, who served in the New Jersey Senate from 1982 to 2002, where he represented the 31st Legislative District.

Education 
Born on Jersey City, New Jersey, O'Connor attended St. Peter's Preparatory School. He earned an A.B. in Modern Languages from Saint Peter's University, followed by a J.D. from Fordham University School of Law. He then earned an L.L.M. from New York University School of Law with a specialization in Labor Law. He served in the United States Army from 1968 to 1970, attaining the rank of captain.

Career
O'Connor was elected in 1981 to fill the seat vacated by fellow Democrat Wally Sheil, defeating Republican Jean C. Lane by a 75.4%-24.7% margin. He was re-elected five times, with his closest scare coming in 1991, when he defeated Republican Bret Schundler by 55.1% to 44.9%.

He served in the Senate on the Judiciary Committee and the Economic Growth, Agriculture and Tourism Committee. He served as Minority Whip starting in 1992. In December 2001, the Senate passed legislation introduced by O'Connor that would establish standards for DNA testing of prison inmates.

References

External links
, New Jersey Legislature.

1942 births
Living people
Fordham University School of Law alumni
New Jersey lawyers
Democratic Party New Jersey state senators
New York University School of Law alumni
Politicians from Jersey City, New Jersey
Saint Peter's University alumni
St. Peter's Preparatory School alumni
United States Army officers
Military personnel from New Jersey